The Karanja River  is a tributary of the Manjira River. The river basin is up to 2,422 km sq. The Karanja river is perennial river. It flows over a distance of 74 km with Karanja reservoir being major water source. The river is not navigable.

Notes and references

Rivers of Telangana
Rivers of Karnataka
Tributaries of the Godavari River
Rivers of India